The Chemin de Fer de La Mure (La Mure railway) is a former coal-carrying electrified railway in (and owned by) the Department of Isère near the city of Grenoble, France, which lost its regular public passenger service from 2 February 1950 (although miners' trains continued until autumn 1962). It lost most of its freight traffic – apart from anthracite coal – in 1952, and even the anthracite ceased from 18 October 1988. However, the local tourist office had been chartering seasonal tourist passenger trains from 8 September 1968 and these developed steadily over the years, the line becoming one of the finest tourist railways in Europe with views over dams and lakes, and mountain scenery. Since 1 February 1998 the concession to operate the line and its tourist trains has been held by CFTA, now Veolia. The line can be reached easily by road from Grenoble, or by trains on the SNCF line towards Gap.

On 26 October 2010, shortly before the end of the season, a landslide destroyed the Viaduc de la Clapisse and parts of a tunnel entrance. In June 2017, the General Council of the Department of Isère announced that the company Edeis had been chosen to repair the railway and take over its operation, with the aim of having it operational again for the 2020 season. Half the line eventually reopened in July 2021, from the top at La Mure as far as the viewpoint at Le Grand Balcon.

History 

The line was built between 1882 and 1886, to link Saint-Georges-de-Commiers and La Mure through a mountainous region of the department of Isère.

The line was almost closed in the mid-1970s and if the country hadn't been suffering an oil crisis the line would have met its end. Its life was extended by fifteen years, which proved to be its saviour. Unlike many other lines this became a tourist attraction which combines an area of industrial heritage with some of the finest scenery on any similar line on the continent.

The railway was electrified in 1903, using a symmetrical current power supply with two overhead lines at plus and minus 1200 volts direct current respectively. In 1950, this non-standard system was replaced with a conventional power supply with a single overhead line at 2400 volts direct current. The branch line between La Mure and Corps was opened in 1932 and closed for passenger traffic in 1952.

Coal traffic ceased in 1988, and most of the coal installations were demolished, the coal being transported by road. The Matheysine coalmines were finally closed on 28 March 1997. The SGLM found a new vocation in providing a tourist attraction and as a result, there remain all of the line's historical installations, the workshops, forge, joinery shop, etc. 
The network's departure and arrival stations were dependent on connections with the PLM railway's Grenoble–Veynes line. The necessary facilities together with the transhipment platform for the automatic transfer of the coal from the SGLM coal cars to the trains operated by PLM (which became SNCF in 1938) were built adjacent to the PLM station, today the station for the Chemin de fer de La Mure.
When they last operated, the trains of the railway ran at the leisurely pace of up to 30 km/h.

Rolling stock

Electric and Electro-Diesel Locomotives

Note 1 : Part of a class of 10 electro-diesel locomotives, 2 are in service at the Chemins de fer du Jura (CJ), 1 at the Chemins de Fer de Provence (CP).

Electric railcars

Passenger trailers

Freight cars

Abbreviations - railroad companies
NStCM.....Chemin de fer Nyon-St-Cergue-Morez
VFD.......

Abbreviations - manufacturers 
ANF.......Ateliers du nord de la france
B+L.......Brissonneau and Lotz, Creil, France
BBC.......Brown, Boveri & Cie
CB........Chantiers de La Buire, Lyon, France 
CGC.......Compagnie General Construction, St. Denis, France
CFMCF.....Compagnie Française de Matériel de Chemin de Fer, Maubeuge, France 
D+B.......Dyle et Bacalan
FL........Compagnie de Fives-Lille, Givors, France 
Ren.......Renault
Richard...Etablissements Richard, St. Denis de l'Hôtel (Loiret), France
SIG.......Schweizerische Industriegesellschaft, Neuhausen am Rheinfall, Switzerland (now Alstom)
SWS.......Schweizerische Wagons- und Aufzügefabrik AG Schlieren-Zürich, Switzerland (closed)
T-H.......Compagnie Francaise Thomson-Houston (Nowadays: Alstom)
Thury.....Ateliers Rene Thury, Geneva. (Later: S.A. Ateliers Secheron (SAAS))

References

External links

Petit Train de La Mure official website
Veolia's official website - but La Mure page withdrawn since 2010 closure 
More information - but not up to date about 2010 closure
More information from French Wikipedia

Heritage railways in France
Tourist attractions in Isère
Metre gauge railways in France
Railway lines in Auvergne-Rhône-Alpes